Gabriel Alomar (1873–1941) was a poet, essayist, educator and diplomat of the early twentieth century in Spain, closely related to the Catalan art movement Modernisme.  He was an active leftist libertarian, chiefly in Barcelona and the other Catalan-speaking regions, from the first years of the 20th century until his death from pneumonia in exile.

Beginnings
Alomar was born in Palma and raised in the Balearic Islands, a traditional province of Spain where the power of the Catholic Church was very strong.  His father was a minor bureaucrat and so was moved around rather often; this made Gabriel's childhood rather more cosmopolitan than was normal for Spanish youngsters of the time.  In 1888, after finishing secondary school in Palma, he (like many young Majorcan men) went to mainland Barcelona to finish his education.  In this environment, he became active as a journalist as well as continuing to publish poetry in what the critic Josephine de Boer has called a Parnassian mode, as well as becoming involved with the Catalan regionalist movement and the literary trend of noucentisme.

Poetry
Gabriel Alomar is often placed by critics among the poets of the Escola Mallorquina, but this choice is problematic.  Alomar's poetry is technically rather conservative in form, but in terms of content it does not fit well with the highly orthodox Catholic beliefs of the other poets associated with the school (Antoni Alcover, Costa i Llobera).  A better-fitting classification is to group his poetry with the Parnassianist strain of Modernista poetry.  While Alomar's verse was and is well regarded in his home territory of Majorca, it is his essays and journalism which continue to be reprinted and read.

Journalism
Alomar's periodical writings tended less toward strict reportage and more toward a polemic style couched in column form.  His columns often read like speeches; in fact, as an educator and secondary school director, many of them began as lectures.  The most famous of these speech-articles, El futurisme, describes Alomar's vision of Spain's present condition, its problems, and his ideas for solving them.  He is credited of inventing the term futurism, as well as partly its ideology, not the Italian poet Filippo Tommaso Marinetti, this discovery being outlined by authors with the stature of Nicaraguan modernist poet Rubén Darío and Chilean avant-garde poet Vicente Huidobro. In essence, Alomar believed that Spain was addicted to its own past, that it preferred to maintain a belief in the regeneration of Iberia's imperial past rather than turn about and face the twentieth century.  For Alomar, the future was far more important than the past, and so this addiction was Spain's main problem. Thus the name.

Diplomat
Gabriel Alomar was the Spanish Ambassador to Italy (1932–34) and Egypt from 1937 to the end of the Spanish Civil War but remained in Egypt until his death in Cairo in 1941.

Influence
Gabriel Alomar had many occupations in his life, but throughout it he was constantly in demand as a writer of prologues.  He wrote dozens, in Castilian Spanish, Catalan, and French, for editions of famous writers and for young authors needing a boost.

See also 
L'Esquella de la Torratxa

References

External links
Webpage devoted to Gabriel Alomar at LletrA (UOC), Catalan Literature Online), in Catalan. 

1873 births
1941 deaths
People from Palma de Mallorca
Socialist Union of Catalonia politicians
Members of the Congress of Deputies of the Second Spanish Republic
Ambassadors of Spain to Italy
Ambassadors of Spain to Egypt
20th-century Spanish poets
Spanish children's writers
Spanish essayists
Catalan-language poets
Catalan-language writers
Modernisme
Spanish male poets
Spanish people of the Spanish Civil War (Republican faction)
Exiles of the Spanish Civil War in Egypt
20th-century essayists
20th-century Spanish male writers